Mimas , also designated Saturn I, is a moon of Saturn discovered in 1789 by William Herschel. It is named after Mimas, a son of Gaia in Greek mythology.

However, Mimas is not actually in hydrostatic equilibrium for its current rotation.

Discovery 

Mimas was discovered by the astronomer William Herschel on 17 September 1789. He recorded his discovery as follows: "I continued my observations constantly, whenever the weather would permit; and the great light of the forty-feet speculum was now of so much use, that I also, on the 17th of September, detected the seventh satellite, when it was at its greatest preceding elongation."

The 40-foot telescope  was a metal mirror reflecting telescope built by Herschel, with a  aperture. The 40 feet refers to the length of the focus, not the aperture diameter as more common with modern telescopes.

Name 

Mimas is named after one of the Giants in Greek mythology, Mimas. The names of all seven then-known satellites of Saturn, including Mimas, were suggested by William Herschel's son John in his 1847 publication Results of Astronomical Observations made at the Cape of Good Hope. Saturn (the Roman equivalent of Cronus in Greek mythology) was the leader of the Titans, the generation before the Gods, and ruler of the world for some time. The Giants were the subsequent generation, and each group fought a great struggle against the Gods.

The Greek and Latin root of the name is Mimant-, and so the English adjectival form is Mimantean or Mimantian, either spelling pronounced  ~ .

Physical characteristics 

The surface area of Mimas is slightly less than the land area of Spain or California. The low density of Mimas, 1.15 g/cm3, indicates that it is composed mostly of water ice with only a small amount of rock. As a result of the tidal forces acting on it, Mimas is noticeably oblate; its longest axis is about 10% longer than the shortest. The ellipsoidal shape of Mimas is especially noticeable in some recent images from the Cassini probe. The impact that made this crater must have nearly shattered Mimas: the surface antipodal to (opposite through the globe) Herschel is highly disrupted, indicating that the shock waves created by the Herschel impact propagated through the whole moon.

The Mimantean surface is saturated with smaller impact craters, but no others are anywhere near the size of Herschel. Although Mimas is heavily cratered, the cratering is not uniform.

Three types of geological features are officially recognized on Mimas: craters, chasmata (chasms) and catenae (crater chains).

Orbital resonances 

A number of features in Saturn's rings are related to resonances with Mimas. Mimas is responsible for clearing the material from the Cassini Division, the gap between Saturn's two widest rings, the A Ring and B Ring. Particles in the Huygens Gap at the inner edge of the Cassini division are in a 2:1 orbital resonance with Mimas. They orbit twice for each orbit of Mimas. The repeated pulls by Mimas on the Cassini division particles, always in the same direction in space, force them into new orbits outside the gap. The boundary between the C and B rings is in a 3:1 resonance with Mimas. Recently, the G Ring was found to be in a 7:6 co-rotation eccentricity resonance with Mimas; the ring's inner edge is about  inside Mimas's orbit.

Mimas is also in a 2:1 mean-motion resonance with the larger moon Tethys, and in a 2:3 resonance with the outer F Ring shepherd moonlet, Pandora.  A moon co-orbital with Mimas was reported by Stephen P. Synnott and Richard J. Terrile in 1982, but was never confirmed.

Anomalous libration 
In 2014, researchers noted that the librational motion of Mimas has a component that cannot be explained by its orbit alone, and concluded that it was due to either an interior that is not in hydrostatic equilibrium (an elongated core) or an internal ocean. However, in 2017 it was concluded that the presence of an ocean in Mimas' interior would have led to surface tidal stresses comparable to or greater than those on tectonically active Europa. Thus, the lack of evidence for surface cracking or other tectonic activity on  Mimas argues against the presence of such an ocean; as the formation of a core would have also produced an ocean and thus the nonexistent tidal stresses, that possibility is also unlikely. The presence of an asymmetric mass anomaly associated with the crater Herschel was considered to be a more likely explanation for the libration.

In 2022, scientists at the Southwest Research Institute identified a tidal heating model for Mimas that produced an internal ocean without any surface cracking or visible tidal stresses. The presence of an internal ocean concealed by a stable icy shell between 24 to 31 km in thickness was found to match the visual and librational characteristics of Mimas as observed by Cassini. Continued measurements of Mimas' surface heat flux will be needed in order to confirm this hypothesis.

Exploration 

Pioneer 11 flew by Saturn in 1979, and its closest approach to Mimas was 104,263 km on September 1, 1979. Voyager 1 flew by in 1980, and Voyager 2 in 1981.

Mimas was imaged several times by the Cassini orbiter, which entered into orbit around Saturn in 2004.

In popular culture 

When seen from certain angles, Mimas resembles the Death Star, a fictional space station and superweapon known from the 1977 film Star Wars. Herschel resembles the concave disc of the Death Star's "superlaser". This is a coincidence, as the film was made nearly three years before Mimas was resolved well enough to see the crater.

In 2010, NASA revealed a temperature map of Mimas, using images obtained by Cassini. The warmest regions, which are along one edge of Mimas, create a shape similar to the video game character Pac-Man, with Herschel Crater assuming the role of an "edible dot" or "power pellet" known from Pac-Man gameplay.

Gallery

See also 
 List of natural satellites
 Mimas in fiction

References

External links 

 Cassini mission page – Mimas
 Mimas Profile at NASA's Solar System Exploration site
 The Planetary Society: Mimas
 Google Mimas 3D, interactive map of the moon
 Mimas page at The Nine Planets
 Views of the Solar System – Mimas
 Cassini images of Mimas
 Images of Mimas at JPL's Planetary Photojournal
 3D shape model of Mimas (requires WebGL)
 Paul Schenk's Mimas blog entry and movie of Mimas's rotation on YouTube
 Mimas global and polar basemaps (June 2012) from Cassini images
 Mimas atlas (July 2010) from Cassini images
 Mimas nomenclature and Mimas map with feature names from the USGS planetary nomenclature page
 Figure "J" is Mimas transiting Saturn in 1979, imaged by Pioneer 11 from here

 
17890917
Discoveries by William Herschel
Moons with a prograde orbit